Quaker Harbour is the irregularly shaped bay indenting for 3.7 km the north coast of Weddell Island in the Falkland Islands. The bay takes its name from nearby Quaker Island.

The British navigator and Antarctic explorer James Weddell, who visited the Falklands in 1819–1824, overwintered ashore on Weddell Island (known at that time as Swan Island) at Quaker Harbour in May–September 1823.

Maps
 The Falkland Islands. Scale 1:401280 map. London: Edward Stanford, 1901
 Falkland Islands Explorer Map. Scale 1:365000. Ocean Explorer Maps, 2007
 Falklands Topographic Map Series. Scale 1:50000, 29 sheets. DOS 453, 1961-1979
 Falkland Islands. Scale 1:643000 Map. DOS 906. Edition 3-OS, 1998
 Map 500k--xm20-4. 1:500000 map of Weddell Island and part of West Falkland. Russian Army Maps (for the world)
 Approaches to the Falkland Islands. Scale 1:1500000 chart. Gps Nautical Charts, 2010
 Illustrated Map of Weddell Island

Gallery

Notes

References
 B. Stonehouse (ed.). Encyclopedia of Antarctica and the Southern Oceans. Chichester, West Sussex: John Wiley & Sons, 2002. 404 pp. 
 C.H. Barnard. A Narrative of the Sufferings and Adventures of Capt. Charles H. Barnard, in a Recent Voyage Round the World, Including an Account of His Residence for Two Years on An Uninhabited Island. New York: J.P. Callender, 1836
 P.P. King and R. Fitzroy. The South America Pilot. Part II. From the Rio de la Plata to the Bay of Panama, including Magellan Strait, the Falkland, and Galapagos Islands.  Fifth Edition. London: Printed for the Hydrographic Office, Admiralty, 1860. pp. 116–118

External links
 Weddell Island Official Website
 Weddell Island from space. NASA Johnson Space Center, 30 April 2005

Bays of the Falkland Islands